Bits and Bytes was the name of two Canadian educational television series produced by TVOntario that taught the basics of how to use a personal computer.

The first series, made in 1983, starred Luba Goy as the Instructor and Billy Van as the Student.  Bits and Bytes 2 was produced in 1991 and starred Billy Van as the Instructor and Victoria Stokle as the Student. The Writer-Producers of both Bits and Bytes and Bits and Bytes 2 were Denise Boiteau & David Stansfield.

Title sequence
The intro sequence featured a montage of common computer terms such as "ERROR", "LOGO" and "ROM", as well as various snippets of simple computer graphics and video effects, accompanied by a theme song that very heavily borrows from the 1978 song "Neon Lights" by Kraftwerk.

Series format
The first series featured an unusual presentation format whereby Luba Goy as the instructor would address Billy Van through a remote video link.  The video link would appear to Luba who was seated in an office on a projection screen in front of her.  She was then able to direct Billy, who appeared on a soundstage with various desktop computer setups of the era.  Popular systems emphasized included the Atari 800, Commodore PET, Tandy TRS-80, and Apple II.  Each episode also included short animated vignettes to explain key concepts, as well as videotaped segments on various developments in computing.

In 1983 TVOntario included the show's episodes as part of a correspondence course. The original broadcasts on TVOntario also had a companion series, The Academy, that was scheduled immediately afterward in which Bits and Bytes technology consultant, Jim Butterfield, appeared as co-host to further elaborate on the concepts introduced in the main series.

Bits and Bytes 2
In the second Bits and Bytes series, produced almost a decade later, Billy Van assumed the role of instructor and taught a new female student. The new series focused primarily on IBM PC compatibles (i.e. Intel-based 286 or 386 computers) running DOS and early versions of Windows, as well as the newer and updated technologies of that era. For that series, a selection of the original's animated spots are reaired to illustrate fundamental computer technology principles along with a number of new spots to cover newly emerged concepts of computer technology such as advances in computer graphics and data management.

Although the possibility of a Bits and Bytes 3 was suggested at the end of the second series, TVOntario eventually elected instead to rebroadcast the Knowledge Network computer series, Dotto's Data Cafe, as a more economical and extensive production on the same subject.

Episodes (1983-84)
 Program 1: Getting Started
 Program 2: Ready-Made Programs
 Program 3: How Programs Work?
 Program 4: File & Data Management 
 Program 5: Communication Between Computers
 Program 6: Computer Languages
 Program 7: Computer-Assisted Instruction
 Program 8: Games & Simulations
 Program 9: Computer Graphics
 Program 10: Computer Music
 Program 11: Computers at Work
 Program 12: What Next?

Episodes (1991)
 Program 1: Basics
 Program 2: Words
 Program 3: Numbers
 Program 4: Files
 Program 5: Messages
 Program 6: Pictures

Crew 
 Original Music - Harry Forbes, George Axon
 Animation Voice - Fred Napoli
 Animation - Grafilm Productions Inc.
 Consultants - Jim Butterfield, David Humphreys, Mike H. Stein, Jo Ann Wilton
 Unit Manager - Rodger Lawson
 Production Editors - Michael Kushner, Paul Spencer, Brian Elston, Doug Beavan
 Production Assistant - George Pyron
 Executive Producer - Mike McManus
 Director - Stu Beecroft
 Written & Produced by - Denise Boiteau and David Stansfield

References

External links 
 TVOntario's official (but incomplete) archive of the original series via the Internet Archive's Wayback Machine
 Complete archive of the original series on YouTube, including episodes and standalone clips of all of the animations and interviews
 
 
 Fansite with more information about the show

1983 Canadian television series debuts
1991 Canadian television series debuts
TVO original programming
Television shows filmed in Toronto
Computer television series
1980s Canadian children's television series
1990s Canadian children's television series